Md. Shahjahan is a Bangladesh Awami League politician and the former Member of Parliament of Sirajganj-6.

Career
Shahjahan was elected to parliament from Sirajganj-6 as a Bangladesh Awami League candidate in 1996.

References

Awami League politicians
Living people
7th Jatiya Sangsad members
Year of birth missing (living people)